Oku Ampofo ( Amanase, November 4, 1908 – 1998 ) was a Ghanaian artist. He became the first Ghanaian to receive a government scholarship to study medicine.

Early life 
Oku Ampofo was born in Amanase in Akuapem. He studied medicine in Edinburgh at the university and Royal College of Edinburgh and Glasgow between 1933 and 1939. In 1939 he obtained his medical degree.

Career 
In 1950 he began to  specialize in the use of medical herbs and exotic medicines. He is to be considered a pioneer in the use of phytotherapy. He founded the Center for Scientific Research in Natural Medicine.

Oku is also an actor and sculptor. He began sculpting during his medical studies in Edinburgh, but later achieved national and international fame. Of particular note is his association the Oku Ampofo foundation which supports community development projects for the people of Ghana and in particular the city of Mampong-Akuapem where for many years he practiced medicine. The Foundation supports research on herbal medicines needed to treat critical diseases in Ghana, West Africa and around the world. Ampofo died in 1998

Artistic practice  
Oku performed hardwood and multi-colored work or concrete. His theoretical and imaginary corpus draws inspiration from the cultural and socio-religious aspects of the Ghanaian way of life.

Exhibitions  
He exhibited in Senegal, Nigeria, England, the United States, Israel, Brazil and Romania . His work influenced Ghanaian artists, painters, sculptors and potters. He participated in the important Tendances et Confrontations exhibition organized during the Mondial des Arts Nègres Festival in Dakar in 1966.

References 

1908 births
1998 deaths
Ghanaian artists
Ghanaian medical doctors
20th-century physicians